Princess Elizabeth of Poland (1326–1361) was the eldest child of Casimir III of Poland and his first wife, Aldona of Lithuania.

Marriage 
Elizabeth was originally betrothed to her future brother-in-law, Louis VI the Roman. She was eventually passed over for her younger sister, Cunigunde.

An agreement, directed primarily against the Teutonic Order, was reached on 24 February 1343 in Poznań between Elizabeth's father and Bogislaw V, Duke of Pomerania. As a result, Elizabeth married Bogislaw on 28 February 1343. She received a dowry from her father of 20,000 kop (cents in Prague) and mainly lived in the Castle of Darlowo during her marriage. The couple had two children:

Elizabeth of Pomerania (1347 – 15 April 1393), wife of  Charles IV, Holy Roman Emperor
Casimir IV of Pomerania (c. 1351 – 2 January 1377)

Her daughter Elizabeth was married in 1363 to the Holy Roman Emperor Charles IV. The marriage took place during the Congress of Kraków; the most celebrated feast commemorating the event took place at the house of Mikołaj Wierzynek (młodszy). Elizabeth of Poland did not live to see her daughter married off. She died in 1361 at a monastery of the Order of Saint Augustine in Świątkach, and was buried there.

Her son, Casimir (Kaźko) was groomed to become Casimir the Great's successor as King of Poland but was sidelined by Louis I of Hungary, and instead succeeded Bogislaw in 1364 as Duke of Pomerania.

Ancestors

References

Sources

1326 births
1361 deaths
Piast dynasty
House of Griffins
Polish princesses
Pomeranian nobility
14th-century Polish people
14th-century Polish women
Daughters of kings